Hot Apple Pie was an American country music band founded in 2002 by Brady Seals (lead vocals), Keith Horne (bass guitar), Trey Landry (drums), and Mark "Sparky" Matejka (guitar). Matjeka was replaced in 2006 by Kevin Ray. Seals was initially co-lead vocalist and keyboardist in the band Little Texas until 1994. Between then and 2002, he recorded three studio albums, including two for Warner Bros. Records. Signed to DreamWorks Records Nashville in 2005, Hot Apple Pie released its self-titled debut album that year. This album produced three chart singles on the Billboard Hot Country Songs charts, including the No. 26-peaking "Hillbillies."

History
Brady Seals was a keyboardist and co-lead vocalist (alongside Tim Rushlow) in the country band Little Texas until late 1994, when he left in pursuit of a solo career. Between then and the early 2000s, Seals recorded three albums, and charted six singles on the country charts.

After deciding that his solo career was not proving successful, Seals opted to form a second band. Guitarist Mark "Sparky" Matejka and drummer Trey Landry, both of whom had backed Seals during his solo career, were recruited, with bass guitarist Keith Horne completing the lineup. These three musicians all had experience prior to the band's foundation. Matejka had played for Sons of the Desert and Charlie Daniels; Landry, for Rodney Crowell and Suzy Bogguss; and Horne, for Waylon Jennings.

First album
In 2005, Hot Apple Pie signed to DreamWorks Records' Nashville division. That year, they released its debut album, also entitled Hot Apple Pie. It produced three singles, all of which charted on the Billboard Hot Country Songs charts: "Hillbillies", "We're Makin' Up" and "Easy Does It." Due to the dissolution of DreamWorks Records in late 2005, these latter two singles were issued on MCA Nashville. The band exited this label in 2006, the same year that Matejka left to join the Southern rock band Lynyrd Skynyrd. Kevin Ray took Matjeka's place in 2006. Seals released another solo album in mid-2009.

Discography

Studio albums

Singles

Music videos

References

American country music groups
DreamWorks Records artists
Musical quartets
Musical groups disestablished in 2008